Nashville: The Original Motion Picture Soundtrack is a 1975 soundtrack album to the musical comedy-drama film Nashville. Featuring compositions and recordings of original musical numbers written by the cast members, the soundtrack was released by ABC Records. It was reissued in February 2015 MCA Nashville.

Reception
Adam Kellner of AllMusic awarded the album four out of five stars, noting: "The at-times charmingly bad, humorous, or excellent soundtrack to Robert Altman's groundbreaking and influential Nashville isn't to be taken at face value throughout."

At the time of the film's release, Keith Carradine's track "I'm Easy" won an Academy Award and Golden Globe Award Best Original Song.

Track listing

References

External links
Nashville: The Original Motion Picture Soundtrack at Discogs

1975 soundtrack albums
ABC Records soundtracks
Country music soundtracks